The Tunbridge Wells Half Marathon is a half marathon road running event that takes place in Tunbridge Wells every February. It is organised by the Tunbridge Wells Harriers running club.

The first Tunbridge Wells Half Marathon was staged in 1983, with just 53 runners. The race came in at number 38 in Runner's World's top 50 races of 2007, and was given a rating of 83 out of 100 by members of the magazine's forum. The magazine said that "The historical villages and the undulating course make for a great race". In 2008 the race attracted over 1,500 entrants.

The race is run on a single  circuit through Tunbridge Wells and some of the nearby villages. It starts at the Tunbridge Wells Sports Centre on St John's Road, and follows the A26 through Southborough, the B2176 along Bidborough Ridge, the B2188 through Penshurst and Fordcombe and the A264 through Langton Green before rejoining the A26 to return to the finish line at the Sports Centre.

Elite race winners
Key:

Men

Women

References

External links
 Tunbridge Wells Harriers TW Half Marathon web page

Half marathons in the United Kingdom
Sport in Royal Tunbridge Wells
Athletics competitions in England